Filipe Antônio Carneiro Fuzaro (born December 5, 1982 in São Paulo) is a Brazilian sport shooter. He won a gold medal for the men's double trap at the 2010 Championship of the Americas Tournament in Rio de Janeiro, with a total score of 179 targets, earning him a spot on the Brazilian team for the Olympics.

Fuzaro represented Brazil at the 2012 Summer Olympics in London, where he competed in the men's double trap. He scored a total of 131 targets in the qualifying rounds by two points behind U.S. shooter Joshua Richmond from the final attempt, finishing only in seventeenth place.

References

External links
NBC Olympics Profile

1982 births
Living people
Brazilian male sport shooters
Trap and double trap shooters
Olympic shooters of Brazil
Shooters at the 2012 Summer Olympics
Sportspeople from São Paulo
South American Games gold medalists for Brazil
South American Games medalists in shooting
Competitors at the 2010 South American Games
20th-century Brazilian people
21st-century Brazilian people